Phillip G. Darns (born July 27, 1959) is a former American football defensive end who played one season in the National Football League (NFL) for the Tampa Bay Buccaneers. Darns also spent time with the Detroit Lions in the NFL and the New Jersey Generals in the United States Football League (USFL).

Early life and education
Darns was born on July 27, 1959, in Tampa, Florida. He attended Tampa Bay Technical High School and played college football at Mississippi Valley State in 1981.

Professional career
He was released at the final roster cuts in August.

In October, Darns was signed by the New Jersey Generals of the United States Football League (USFL) for their  season. He was released in February 1983.

Darns was later signed back into the NFL by the Detroit Lions, but was injured and was placed on injured reserve, where he spent the whole  season. He was released by the Lions on August 27, .

In November, Darns was signed by the Tampa Bay Buccaneers. He played in two games with the Buccaneers, a week 13 loss to the Los Angeles Rams and a week 14 loss against the Green Bay Packers. He wore number 75 with the team. Darns was placed on injured reserve after his two appearances.

In , Darns attended a Tampa Bay Bandits tryout camp.

Later life
In 1991, Darns was an assistant coach at Tampa Catholic High School. In 2002, he was reported as being a coach at Blake High School in Tampa.

Darns later became a firefighter.

References

1959 births
Living people
Players of American football from Tampa, Florida
American football defensive ends
Mississippi Valley State Delta Devils football players
New York Jets players
New Jersey Generals players
Detroit Lions players
Tampa Bay Buccaneers players
High school football coaches in Florida